Ladonia can refer to:

 Ladonia, Alabama, United States
 Ladonia, North Carolina, United States
 Ladonia, Texas, United States
 Ladonia (micronation)

See also
 Laddonia, Missouri, United States